Jonathan Forbes (born 4 December 1976 in Dublin) is an Irish actor.

Early life
Forbes was born in Dublin, Ireland on 4 December 1976. He attended Gonzaga College where he was in the same class as fellow actor Andrew Scott, before studying English at University College Dublin.

Career
Forbes trained at Bristol Old Vic Theatre School, graduating in 2001 as a BBC Carleton Hobbs Award winner.

In 2001 he played the lead role in John Deery's debut feature Conspiracy of Silence, for which he was nominated Best Newcomer at the inaugural Irish Film and Television Awards. He made his stage debut in Trevor Nunn's production of A Streetcar Named Desire at The Lyttelton Theatre in 2002. Other theatre highlights include Michael Boyd's first season at the RSC (Romeo and Juliet, Hamlet, King Lear), Cyrano de Bergerac (Chichester Festival Theatre) and The Good Soldier (Theatre Royal Bath). Television highlights include Hornblower, Foyle's War and Titanic, Blood and Steel.

In 2011, he appeared in "The National Anthem", an episode of the anthology series Black Mirror.

From 2013 to 2016, Forbes has provided the voice of the character Connor in the CGI version of the iconic British TV series Thomas and Friends.

In 2015 he starred opposite Sharon Horgan and American comedian Rob Delaney in Catastrophe, a six-part comedy series for Channel 4 which first aired in the UK on 19 January 2015. The second series of the show also aired in 2015, and the third in 2017. The fourth and final series was broadcast in 2019.

In 2016 he starred in the BBC Radio 4 drama Tracks as Freddy Fuller alongside Romola Garai.

In 2019, Forbes starred as the title character in the play Hamlet, which began its performance on 28 March 2019

Filmography

Film

Television

Video games

Radio

References

External links

CV at Curtis Brown Agents
2009 Interview with Derby Telegraph

1976 births
Living people
Irish male television actors
Irish male radio actors
Irish male voice actors
Irish male film actors
20th-century Irish male actors
21st-century Irish male actors